Víctor Idava (born 28 May 1956) is a Filipino long-distance runner. He competed in the marathon at the 1976 Summer Olympics.

References

External links
 

1956 births
Living people
Athletes (track and field) at the 1976 Summer Olympics
Filipino male long-distance runners
Filipino male marathon runners
Olympic track and field athletes of the Philippines
Place of birth missing (living people)